The national flag of the Islamic Republic of Iran, also known as the tricolor, is a tricolour comprising equal horizontal bands of green, white and red with the national emblem ("Allah") in red centred on the white band and the takbir written 11 times each in the Kufic script in white, at the bottom of the green and the top of the red band. After the Iranian Revolution of 1979, the present-day flag was adopted on 29 July 1980. Many Iranian exiles opposed to the Iranian government use alternate flags, including the tricolor flag with the Lion and Sun at the center, or the tricolor without additional emblems.

Flag description

Emblem

The parliament of Iran, per the 1980 constitution, changed the flag and seal of state insofar as the Lion and Sun were replaced by the red emblem in the centre of the flag. Designed by Hamid Nadimi, and officially approved by Parliament and the Leader Grand Ayatollah Khomeini on 9 May 1980, this emblem is a highly stylised composite of various Islamic elements: a geometrically symmetric form of the word Allah ("God") and overlapping parts of the phrase lā ʾilāha ʾillā l-Lāh (There is no God Except Allah), forming a monogram consisting of four crescents and a line in the shape of a tulip. The four crescents read from right to left; the first crescent is the letter aleph, the second crescent is the first laam; the vertical line is the second laam, and the third and fourth crescents together form the heh. Above the central stroke is a tashdid (a diacritical mark indicating gemination) resembling "W". The tulip shape of the emblem as a whole memorialises those who have died for Iran and symbolises the values of patriotism and self-sacrifice, building on a legend that red tulips grow from the shed blood of martyrs. This emblem is somewhat similar to the Khanda but has no relation to Sikhism and its meaning to that religious community.

Kufic script

Written in white and repeated eleven times on the inner edges of each the green and the red band is the phrase Allahu Akbar (God is the greatest) in a stylised version of the kufic script. This symbolises the calls of Allahu Akbar on the night of 22 Bahman (11 February 1979) when the national radio of Iran broadcast: "From Tehran, the voice of the Islamic Republic of Iran" and marked the unofficial beginning of the Islamic Republic (with the official day being 2 May). This writing renders the flag non-reversible.

Colours

The colours of the Iranian flag are traditional, probably dating from at least the 18th century, and they can be interpreted as representing the Islamic religion (green), peace (white), and courage (red).

Cyrus the Great, a Persian, defeated his grandfather Astyages, the High Judge (King) of the Medes, and founded Iran by uniting the Persians and the Medes. The Iranian flag (which was later designed under Darius I the Great) symbolised this unity and victory (green above white and red) as the flag of the people of Iran.

Colours scheme

Construction

Physical requirements for the Iranian flag, a simple construction sheet, and a compass-and-straightedge construction for the emblem and the takbir are described in the national Iranian standard ISIRI 1. The flag's aspect ratio is explicitly set at 4:7 in the standard. Several other sizes of parts of the flags are described in the simple construction sheet, but these values are not all consistent with the precise values obtained if following the classical construction.

History

Flags, standards, and banners have always been important national and imperial symbols for Iranians, both in war and peace. Xenophon reports that Cyrus the Great's standard was a golden eagle with spread wings, mounted on a long shaft.

The best-known symbol of Iran in recent centuries has been the Lion and Sun motif, which is a graphic expression of the astrological configuration of the sun in the sign of Leo, although both celestial and animal figures have long and independent histories in Iranian heraldry. Late in the nineteenth century the Lion and Sun motif was combined with an earlier scimitar motif and superimposed on a tricolour of green, white, and red. With minor modifications, this remained the official flag until the revolution of 1979.

Prehistory

The oldest flag found in Iran is the Bronze Age Shahdad Standard, found in Shahdad, Kerman Province, dating back to c. 2400 BCE, made of bronze. It features a seated man and a kneeling woman facing each other, with a star in between. This iconography can be found in other Bronze Age pieces of art in the area as well.

Achaemenid empire

The Old Persian word for "banner, standard" was drafša- (Avestan drafša-, Middle Persian drafš, cognate with Sanskrit  drapsá-).
Xenophon in Cyropaedia (7.1.4) describes the standard of Artaxerxes II at Cunaxa as "a golden eagle, with outspread wings, borne aloft on a long spear-shaft", the same banner recorded to be used by Cyrus the Great.

According to Herodotus (9.59), each Persian army division had its own standard, and "all officers had banners over their tents" (Xenophon, 8.5.13). One such banner, a square plaque in saltire, is depicted on a Greek vase, the so-called "Douris cup" held by the Louvre. A similar design is known from an Urartian bronze disk from Altıntepe. 
Similar square plaques on poles are known from six of the audience scenes of the Throne Hall relief at Persepolis. The Alexander Mosaic of Pompeii, a Roman-era copy of a Hellenistic painting dated c. 320 BCE, also shows the royal Persian standard., depicted as a rectangular plaque, possibly originally in purple, with a dark red border with yellow dots. In the field, a golden bird is only partially preserved. The "royal falcon" of Persia (varəγna) represented farr or "glory", while the eagle was associated with the Achaemenid dynasty itself.

A square tile representing a miniature (12 cm2) banner
was discovered at Persepolis in 1948. The tile is made of Egyptian blue frit and likely represents Egyptian Horus, but in the Persian context suggests local association with the Avestan varəγna or the royal eagle of the Achaemenids.

Sassanid empire

In Sassanid times the imperial flag was a leather rectangle covered with a thin layer of silk ornamented with jewels, with a four-pointed star at the centre, indicating the four corners of the world. This is the same star referred to as Akhtare Kaviani ("the Kaviani star") by Ferdowsi in the epic Shahnameh (Book of Kings). The flag was larger than the original Derafsh Kaviani apron and suspended from a lance, the point of which appeared above it. Attached to the lower edge were tassels of yellow, magenta, and scarlet, with large pendant jewels. The flag was destroyed by invading Muslim Arabs after their decisive defeat of the Sassanids.

Seljuk Empire
Various emblems and banners have been recorded to be used by the Seljuks in different periods. Early Seljuks were using their traditional emblems, but they gradually adopted local Muslim emblems and banners. The official flag of the empire was most probably a black flag, similar to the flag of the Abbasid Caliphate. The flag was decorated with emblems, which were either superimposed over it or was placed above the flag. This black flag was traditionally presented to the Seljuk sovereigns by the Abbasid caliphs.

A yellow flag was also used to denote Seljuk sovereignty over a town.

Ghaznavid dynasty
The Turkic Ghaznavid dynasty were invested in  promoting Iranian culture. They are known to have displayed a number of heraldic emblems that harked back to pre-Islamic Iran, including the Sun and Lion motif, as well as the Griffin motif. Their banners appear to have shown chequered motifs.

Safavid dynasty

The Safavid dynasty (1501–1736) used three green flags, each with a different emblem. Ismail I, the first Safavid king, designed a green flag with a golden full moon. In 1524 Tahmasp I replaced the moon with an emblem of a sheep and sun; this flag was used until 1576. It was then that Ismail II adopted the first Lion and Sun device, embroidered in gold, which was to remain in use until the end of the Safavid era. During this period the Lion and Sun stood for two pillars of the society: the state and religion. Although various alams and banners were employed by the Safavids (especially during the reign of the first two kings), by the time of Shah Abbas I the Lion and Sun symbol had become one of the most popular emblems of Iran.

The Safavid interpretation of this symbol is believed to have been based on a combination of historical legends like the Shahnameh, stories of prophets, and other Islamic sources. For the Safavids the king (shah) had two functions: he was both a ruler and a holy personage. This double role was considered the patrimony of the Iranian kings, derived from Jamshid, mythical founder of the ancient Persian kingdom, and Ali, the first Shi'a Imam. Jamshid was associated with the sun and Ali with the lion (from his epithet "Lion of God"). The correspondence may originally have been based on a learned interpretation of the Shahnameh references to "the Sun of Iran" and "the Moon of the Turanians". Since the crescent moon had been adopted as the dynastic (and ultimately national) emblem of the Ottoman sultans, who were the new sovereigns of Rum, the Safavids of Iran, needing to have a dynastic and national emblem of their own, chose the Lion and Sun motif. The sun had further important meanings for the Safavid world, where time was organised around a solar calendar, in contrast to the Arabo-Islamic lunar system. In the zodiac the sun is linked to Leo; for the Safavids the Lion and Sun symbol conveyed the double meaning of the royal and holy figure of the shah (Jamshid and Ali), the auspicious astrological configuration bringing the cosmic pair and the earthly—king and imam—together.

Regarding the Safavid understanding of the Lion and Sun motif, Shahbazi suggests that "the Safavids had reinterpreted the lion as symbolizing Imam ʿAlī and the sun as typifying the 'glory of religion', a substitute for the ancient farr-e dīn." They reintroduced the ancient concept of God-given glory (farr) to justify their rulership, attributing these qualities to Ali while tracing the king's genealogy through the Shia Fourth Imam's mother to the royal Sassanian house.

Flags

Afsharid dynasty
Nader Shah consciously avoided the using the colour green, as green was associated with Shia Islam and the Safavid dynasty.

The two imperial standards were placed on the right of the square already mentioned: one of them was in stripes of red, blue, and white, and the other of red, blue, white, and yellow, without any other ornament: though the old standards required 12 men to move them, the SHAH lengthened their staffs, and made them yet heavier; he also put new colours of silk upon them, the one red and yellow striped, the other yellow edged with red: they were made of such an enormous size, to prevent their being carried off by the enemy, except by an entire defeat. The regimental colours were a narrow slip of silk, sloped to a point, some were red, some white, and some striped. 

Navy Admiral flag being a white ground with a red Persian Sword in the middle.
Although based on the writings of Jonas Hanway, we can see that the flags of the army regiments of King Nader were three-eared, but we cannot come to a conclusion about whether the royal flags of that time were three-eared or four-eared.

Flags

Zand dynasty
The state flag of the Zand dynasty was a white triangular pennant with a green border and a gold lion and sun in the centre. Another version included the same design but with green and red.

Flags

Early Qajar dynasty

Unlike their Zand and Afsharid predecessors, the Qajar rulers used rectangular flags. The flag of Mohammad Khan Qajar was red with a gold lion and sun inside of a pale yellow circle.

Fat′h Ali Shah adopted a lion emblem on a plain red field as his war flag. The main emblem was a lion couchant in front of a sun, but a design featuring a lion passant holding a sword was also in use. There was a green version of the flag for peacetime and a white version for diplomatic purposes.

During the reign of Mohammad Shah, the two different lion emblems were combined into a single flag which featured a lion passant holding a sword in front of a sun.

Under Nasser al-Din Shah, the principal flag was white with a green border on three sides and a lion and emblem in the centre. There was also a naval ensign which had a red and green border and a civil ensign which looked the same as the naval ensign but without the lion and sun in the middle.

All flags had a 3:4 ratio.

Flags

Post-Constitutional Revolution

The first version of the modern Iranian tricolour was adopted in the wake of the Iranian Constitutional Revolution of 1906. The Supplementary Fundamental Laws of 7 October 1907 described the flag as a tricolour of green, white, and red, with a lion and sun emblem in the middle. A decree dated 4 September 1910 specified the exact details of the emblem, including the shape of the lion's tail ("like an italic S") and the position and the size of the lion, the sword, and the sun.

During this period, the colours of the flag were very pale, with the red appearing closer to pink in practice. There were three variants of the flag in use. The state flag was a tricolour with the lion and sun emblem in the centre. The national flag and civil ensign was a plain tricolour with no emblem. The naval ensign and war flag was similar to the state flag, but the emblem was surrounded by a wreath and surmounted by a crown. All three flags had a 1:3 ratio.

The flag was modified twice during the Pahlavi era. In 1933, the colours of the flag were darkened and the design of the emblem was changed. The sun's facial features were removed and the Kiani Crown on the naval ensign was replaced with the Pahlavi Crown. In 1964, the ratio was changed from 1:3 to 4:7 and the emblem on the naval ensign was shrunk to fit entirely within the white stripe.

Following the Iranian Revolution, the Interim Government of Iran removed the crown from the naval ensign. The old state and national flags remained unchanged until 29 July 1980, when the modern Iranian flag was adopted.

Historical flags

The new Iranian government viewed the Lion and Sun symbol as representing the "oppressive Westernising monarchy" that had to be replaced, despite the emblem's traditional Shi'a meanings and the lion's association with Ali, the first Imam of the Shi'a. For that reason, the name of the Red Lion and Sun Society was changed to Red Crescent Society.

Currently, the Lion and Sun flag is used by Iranian communities in exile as a symbol of opposition to the Islamic Republic. Some political groups in Iran, including monarchists, continue to use it as well. In Los Angeles, California and other cities with large Iranian expatriate communities, the Lion and Sun, as a distinguishing marker, appears on Iranian flags and souvenirs to an extent that far surpasses its display during the years of monarchy in its homeland, where the plain tricolour was usually used.

After the Islamic Revolution in Iran and the replacement of the lion and sun flag with the new flag, new designs of this flag were still presented, prominently by the MeK.

The use of the tri-color Iran flag with the writing "Women Life Freedom" has been used during the Mahsa Amini protests that began in September 2022. Participants held up Iranian flags during the diaspora protests in Berlin, many with the tagline “Women, Life, Freedom” in both English and German.

Historical flags

Gallery

See also

 Emblem of Iran
 Imperial Standards of Iran
 Lion and Sun
 Flag of Kurdistan
 Flag of Tajikistan
 List of flags used by Iranian peoples
 List of Iranian flags
 Flags of the Islamic Republic of Iran Armed Forces

References

Citations

External links 

 Flags of the World.
 Vexilla Mundi.
 
 Flags Of Iran
 Flags i. Of Persia—Encyclopædia Iranica
 Iran Flag & National Anthem
 Geometric, algebraic and numeric construction of the National Flag
 Iran's Lion and Sun flag website

Iran
Flags of Iran
Iran
Iranian culture
Iran
National symbols of Iran